Dora or The Sexual Neuroses of Our Parents is a 2015 Swiss drama film directed by Stina Werenfels. It was screened in the Panorama section of the 65th Berlin International Film Festival. It was one of seven films shortlisted by Switzerland to be their submission for the Academy Award for Best Foreign Language Film at the 88th Academy Awards, but it lost out to Iraqi Odyssey.

Cast
  as Dora
 Jenny Schily as Kristin
 Lars Eidinger as Peter
  as Felix
  as Barbara
 Thelma Buabeng as Maria
  as Sara
  as Susanne
 Knut Berger as Dr. Neumann
  as Frau Heise
  as Franzi
  as Professor

References

External links
 

2015 films
2015 drama films
Swiss drama films
2010s German-language films
Swiss films based on plays